St. Joseph Boys’ High School is a day school located in Khadki of Pune district, in the Indian state of Maharashtra. The school is an English Medium School established and managed by the Poona Diocesan Education Society. It is recognized by the Government of Maharashtra and consists of ten standards beyond Pre-Primary classes. It primarily prepares pupils for the Secondary School Certificate (S.S.C) Examination.

St. Joseph Boys’ High School aims at an inclusive education – academic, physical, moral and spiritual – primarily to Catholics, but welcoming children irrespective of religion or race as is consistent with Catholic principles. The patron St. Joseph is a model of living for its staff and students.

Location
The school is situated in the northern part of Pune city, in the town of Kirkee, in the vicinity of the heritage monument of the St. Ignatius Church, the Court, and the Kirkee Cantonment Board. The school is surrounded by the lush green trees on one side, and the calm and pleasant atmosphere of the cantonment makes studying here favourable.

Philosophy 
The philosophy was defined by its founder principal Rev. Fr. Manuel Mascarenhas. Born into a well-off and well-educated family, he devoted himself to uplifting those in need. He declined offers to head elite schools in Pune to establish an institution where the need was higher. Khadki was a small suburb primarily populated by workers of the ammunition factory and those employed in the Khadki Cantonment. When he left the school, every child in Khadki would credit the school as having "done something for him".

Facilities
The school has grounds plus two storied quadrangular building where classrooms are situated. It has Physics, Chemistry and Biology labs. The school has two computer labs , a drawing room and a library. The school building is surrounded by a ground used for sports and an assembly ground. St Joseph's school has a big auditorium where various programmes and meetings are held regularly.

Academics
The school is divided into the pre-primary, primary, secondary and higher secondary sections. The school is affiliated to the Maharashtra State Board of Secondary and Higher Secondary Education. 10th standard students give the S.S.C. exams respectively each year.

Sports

The school focuses in hockey and often competes in Inter-School Hockey Tournaments; seniors, juniors, sub-junior section titles have been won by the school.

Khadki is thought by some to be the cradle of Indian hockey. The school shares this tradition with some other schools of Khadki area, and has won many laurels.

Past principals

 1963 - 1979 : Late Rev. Dr. Fr. Manuel Mascarenhas.
 
 1979 - 1980 : Fr.  James Luke.
 
 1980 - 1984 : Late Rev. Dr. Fr. Manuel Mascarenhas.
 
 1984 - 1989 : Late Fr.  Nelson Machado.
 
 1989 - 1995 : Fr.  James Luke.
 
 1995 - 2000 : Fr. Joachim Patrick.
 
 2000 - 2004 : Fr. Isidore Soares.
 
 2004 - 2006 : Fr. Louis D’Mello.
 
 2006 - 2010 : Fr.  Elias Rodrigues.
 
 2010 - 2013 : Fr. Louis D’Mello.

 2013 – 2015: Mrs. Rosie Siqueira.

 2015 - Today: Fr. Anand Gaikwad

Notable alumni
 Kay Kay Menon, is an Indian actor.
 Ruturaj Gaikwad , is a First Class Cricketer

Gallery

External links
St Joseph Boys High School website

References

Catholic secondary schools in India
Primary schools in India
High schools and secondary schools in Maharashtra
Christian schools in Maharashtra
Schools in Pune district